Thomas Flaws (13 May 1932 – 24 June 2021) was a New Zealand cricketer. A wicket-keeper, he played 27 first-class matches for Otago between 1952 and 1963.

See also
 List of Otago representative cricketers

References

External links
 

1932 births
2021 deaths
New Zealand cricketers
Otago cricketers
Cricketers from Dunedin